Pycnobaris is a genus of flower weevils in the beetle family Curculionidae. There are about five described species in Pycnobaris.

Species
These five species belong to the genus Pycnobaris:
 Pycnobaris canonica Casey, 1920
 Pycnobaris nigrostriata Fall, 1913
 Pycnobaris nigrostriatus Fall, 1913
 Pycnobaris pruinosa (LeConte, 1876)
 Pycnobaris squamotecta Casey, 1892

References

Further reading

 
 
 

Baridinae
Articles created by Qbugbot